Gabriel Markus and John Sobel won in the final 6–4, 1–6, 7–5 against Ricardo Acioly and Mauro Menezes.

Seeds
Champion seeds are indicated in bold text while text in italics indicates the round in which those seeds were eliminated.

  Luiz Mattar /  Jaime Oncins (first round)
  Christian Miniussi /  Diego Pérez (semifinals)
  Gustavo Luza /  Nicolás Pereira (quarterfinals)
  Horacio de la Peña /  Cássio Motta (quarterfinals)

Draw

External links
1992 Maceió Open Doubles Draw

Doubles